Uranium diselenide is a compound of uranium and selenium. It has a β form that has orthorhombic crystal system.  The family of crystals it matches is PbCl2.  The dimensions of the unit cell are a: 7.455 Å, b: 4.2320 Å, c= 8.964 Å.  The compound has the unusual property of ferromagnetism, but only if the temperature is below 14 K.

Tellurium can be substituted for selenium in varying quantities, expanding the lattice and increasing the ferromagnetic Curie temperature.

References

Uranium(IV) compounds
Selenides
Dichalcogenides